Customized Greatley Vol. 3 is the fifth mixtape by American rapper Casey Veggies. It was self-released on April 9, 2012. The mixtape features guest appearances from Jhené Aiko, Tyler, the Creator, Raheem DeVaughn, Earl Sweatshirt, Domo Genesis, and Hodgy Beats, among others.

Track listing

References

2012 mixtape albums
Casey Veggies albums
Self-released albums
Sequel albums